Brett Marx (born December 26, 1964) is an American movie and television actor and producer who appeared  as Jimmy Feldman in the Bad News Bears movies.

Biography
Marx was born in Los Angeles, California. He graduated from North Hollywood High School.

He has appeared on television, in one episode each of Tales from the Darkside, My Two Dads and Party of Five. In 1981, he was nominated for a Genie Award for Best Performance by a Foreign Actor in The Lucky Star.

Today, Marx is a commercial and film producer. He is married and has two children.

Filmography

References

External links
 

American male film actors
American male television actors
1964 births
Living people
American people of German-Jewish descent
North Hollywood High School alumni
Male actors from Los Angeles